Givira pardana is a moth in the family Cossidae. It is found in São Paulo, Brazil.

The wingspan is about 30 mm. The forewings are light brown with a basal, inner, outer and subterminal row of round, dark brown spots, edged with whitish. There are traces of darker, transverse, irregular and broken lines on the hindwings.

References

Moths described in 1901
Givira